Stevon Nathaniel Moore (born February 9, 1967) is an American former football player who was selected by the New York Jets in the 7th round (181st overall) of the 1989 NFL Draft. A 5'11", 204-lb. safety from the University of Mississippi, Moore played in nine NFL seasons from 1990 to 1999.

References

1967 births
Living people
Sportspeople from Gulfport, Mississippi
American football safeties
Ole Miss Rebels football players
Miami Dolphins players
Cleveland Browns players
Baltimore Ravens players
People from Wiggins, Mississippi
Players of American football from Mississippi
Ed Block Courage Award recipients